Bojonegoro Station is the largest railway station in Sukorejo, Bojonegoro, Bojonegoro Regency, East Java. The station is owned and operated by PT Kereta Api Indonesia.

Services
The following is a list of train services at the Bojonegoro Station

Intercity
Bojonegoro Station is served with intercity rail services that cover longer distances than regional rail services and usually call only at large stations along the way. Sembrani has all executive (first class) train set and provides the fastest traveling time to Jakarta and Surabaya. Gumarang and Harina have mixed classes consisting of executive and economy (second class). Both Kertajaya and Jayabaya consist of all economy train sets. The only intercity train that does not stop at Bojonegoro station is Argo Bromo Anggrek. All intercity services are operated by PT Kereta Api Indonesia.
 Sembrani, which travels between Jakarta Gambir and Surabaya Pasar Turi, calls at Bojonegoro once daily in each direction. 
 Gumarang, which travels between Jakarta Pasar Senen and Surabaya Pasar Turi, calls at Bojonegoro once daily in each direction.
 Harina, which travels between Surabaya Pasar Turi and Bandung via , calls at Bojonegoro once daily in each direction.
 Kertajaya, which travels between Jakarta Pasar Senen and Surabaya Pasar Turi, calls at Bojonegoro once daily in each direction.
 Jayabaya, which travels between Jakarta Pasar Senen and Malang via Surabaya Gubeng, calls at Bojonegoro once daily in each direction.

Regional
Bojonegoro railway station is also served with some regional rail services that operate between small towns and cities with more stops over shorter distances than intercity rail services.

 Bojonegoro Local, serves commuters to Surabaya Pasar Turi, Surabaya Gubeng, and Sidoarjo once daily.

Self-service machines
To ease queueing at ticket counters, a self-service ticket printing machine and an electronic ticket kiosk have been installed. Since 9 August 2016, all passengers must check themselves in and print boarding passes at self-service check-in machines before boarding in addition to showing tickets and valid identifications (e.g. Kartu Tanda Penduduk/KTP, Surat Izin Mengemudi/SIM or passport).

References

External links

 Kereta Api Indonesia
 Ticket booking
 Ticket booking
 Kereta Api Kita

Bojonegoro Regency
Railway stations in East Java